The 1947 NCAA baseball season, play of college baseball in the United States organized by the National Collegiate Athletic Association (NCAA) began in the spring of 1947. The season progressed through the regular season and concluded with the 1947 NCAA baseball tournament and 1947 College World Series. The College World Series, held for the first time in 1947, consisted of the two remaining teams in the NCAA Tournament and was held in Kalamazoo, Michigan at Hyames Field as a best of three series. California claimed the championship two games to none over Yale.

Realignment 
The Southern Conference resumed sponsoring baseball in 1947, with 16 teams.

Conference winners 
This is a partial list of conference champions from the 1947 season. Each of the eight geographical districts chose, by various methods, the team that would represent them in the NCAA Tournament. Conference champions had to be chosen, unless all conference champions declined the bid.

Conference standings 
The following is an incomplete list of conference standings:

NCAA tournament 

The 1947 season marked the first NCAA Baseball Tournament, which consisted of eight teams divided into two brackets by region. The Eastern playoff was held in New Haven, Connecticut, while the Western playoff was held in Denver, Colorado. The winner of each single elimination bracket advanced to the inaugural College World Series in Kalamazoo, MI, where California defeated Yale in a best of three series.

Award winners

All-America team

References